Clydesdale North is one of the 20 electoral wards of South Lanarkshire Council. Created in 2007, the ward elects three councillors using the single transferable vote electoral system and covers an area with a population of 14,726 people.

The ward has politically been split between the Scottish National Party (SNP), Labour and the Conservatives. Each party has held one of the three seats since the creation of the ward apart from the period following the 2012 election when independent councillor Ed Archer won a seat from the Conservatives.

Boundaries
The ward was created following the Fourth Statutory Reviews of Electoral Arrangements ahead of the 2007 Scottish local elections. As a result of the Local Governance (Scotland) Act 2004, local elections in Scotland would use the single transferable vote electoral system from 2007 onwards so Clydesdale North was formed from an amalgamation of several previous first-past-the-post wards. It contained the majority of the former Forth ward, part of the previous Clyde Valley ward as well as all of the former Lanark North and Lanark South wards and a small area from each of the former Carstairs/Carnwath and Lesmahagow wards. Clydesdale North covers an area in the northeast of South Lanarkshire next to its boundaries with North Lanarkshire Council and West Lothian Council and takes in the town of Lanark plus Kirkfieldbank and a rural area to the northeast including the villages of Forth and Auchengray. The ward also contains the New Lanark UNESCO World Heritage Site. Following the Fifth Statutory Reviews of Electoral Arrangements ahead of the 2017 Scottish local elections, the ward's boundaries were not changed.

Councillors

Election results

2022 election

2017 election

2012 election

2007 election

Notes

References

Wards of South Lanarkshire
Clydesdale
Lanark